Chilabothrus gracilis is a species of nonvenomous snake in the Boidae family. It is endemic to Hispaniola (split between Haiti and the Dominican Republic).

Description

Dorsally it is blackish gray, with small black spots, which are arranged in six series running down the body. Ventrally it is lighter in color.

The smooth dorsal scales are arranged in 40 rows. Ventrals 282–289; anal plate entire; subcaudals 100-103 also entire.

The body is slender and strongly laterally compressed. Upper labials 11 or 12, the sixth and seventh (or fifth and sixth) entering the eye.

Subspecies
Two subspecies are recognized:

Chilabothrus gracilis gracilis (J.G. Fischer, 1888)
Chilabothrus gracilis hapalus Sheplan & Schwartz, 1974

References

Further reading
 Fischer, J.G. 1888. Über eine Kollektion Reptilien und Amphibien von Hayti. Jahrbuch der Hamburgischen Wissenschaftlichen Anstalten 5: 23–45. ("Chilabothrus gracilis sp. n.", pp. 35–36 + Plate III., Figures 8a & 8b.)

gracilis
Reptiles of Haiti
Reptiles of the Dominican Republic
Endemic fauna of Hispaniola
Taxa named by Johann Gustav Fischer
Reptiles described in 1888
Snakes of the Caribbean